Martin Conway (born 8 April 1974) is an Irish Fine Gael politician who has served as a Senator for the Administrative Panel since April 2011.

He is the Fine Gael Seanad Spokesperson on Health.

He was a member of Clare County Council from 2004 to 2011 for the Ennistymon local electoral area. He was the Fine Gael Seanad spokesperson on Justice and Equality.

He is a founder member of AHEAD (Association for Higher Education Access and Disability), a charity working to improve access to further and higher education for people with disabilities.

He was an unsuccessful candidate for the Clare constituency at the 2020 general election.

References

External links
Martin Conway's page on the Fine Gael website

1974 births
Living people
Politicians from County Clare
Members of the 24th Seanad
Members of the 25th Seanad
Members of the 26th Seanad
Fine Gael senators
Local councillors in County Clare
Alumni of University College Dublin
Blind politicians
Irish blind people